The Malibu Sessions is the sixth studio album by American recording artist Colbie Caillat. It was released on October 7, 2016 under her own independent record label PlummyLou Records. "Goldmine" was released as the lead single on July 20, 2016.

Track listing
Songwriting credits derived from CD jacket.

Charts

References

2016 albums
Colbie Caillat albums